Polystachya bifida is a species of flowering plant in the family Orchidaceae, native from south-east Nigeria to west-central tropical Africa. It was first described by John Lindley in 1862.

Distribution
Polystachya bifida is native to south-east Nigeria and large parts of west-central tropical Africa: Burundi, Cameroon, Equatorial Guinea, Gabon, the Gulf of Guinea islands, Rwanda and the Democratic Republic of the Congo.

Conservation
Polystachya farinosa was assessed as "endangered" in the 2017 IUCN Red List, where it is said to be native only to Cameroon. , P. farinosa was regarded as a synonym of Polystachya bifida, which has a much wider distribution.

References

bifida
Flora of Burundi
Flora of Cameroon
Flora of Equatorial Guinea
Flora of Gabon
Flora of the Gulf of Guinea islands
Flora of Nigeria
Flora of Rwanda
Flora of the Democratic Republic of the Congo
Plants described in 1862